Nikkasaurus is an extinct genus of therapsids first named and described by Ivakhnenko.

Description
Nikkasaurus was a small therapsid, with a skull about 5 cm long. The eyes had large orbits and sclerotic rings, and the head was tilted back, as with all therapsids. The skull looks superficially similar to those of the pelycosaurs, in particular members of Varanopidae.

Biology
Nikkasaurus was probably mainly insectivorous, and possibly nocturnal.

Systematics
The only known species is the type species N. tatarinovi, described by MF Ivahnenko in 2000, from the Middle Permian Mezen River Basin. Nikkasaurus is possibly a relic of a more ancient stage of therapsid development.

See also
 List of therapsids

References

 Kemp, Thomas Stainforth (2005). The Origin and Evolution of Mammals. .

Prehistoric therapsid genera
Guadalupian synapsids of Europe
Guadalupian genus first appearances
Guadalupian genus extinctions
Permian Russia
Fossils of Russia
Fossil taxa described in 2000